State Route 138 (SR 138) is part of Maine's system of numbered state highways, located entirely in Sagadahoc County. It then reaches SR 197 in Richmond, and ends at the junction with US 201 in Richmond.

Route description
SR 138 begins at an intersection with US 201 in Bowdoin. After splitting from SR 125 in Bowdoinham, SR 138 heads north through Richmond, where it intersects SR 197 and terminates at US 201 in Richmond.

Junction list

References

External links

Maine State Route log via floodgap.com

138
Transportation in Sagadahoc County, Maine